is a private university in Kyoto, Japan, that traces its origin to 1869. With the Kinugasa Campus (KIC) in Kyoto, and Kyoto Prefecture, the university also has a satellite called Biwako-Kusatsu Campus (BKC) and Osaka-Ibaraki Campus (OIC).

Today, Ritsumeikan university is known as one of western Japan's four prestige private universities. "KAN-KAN-DO-RITS" 関関同立 (Kwansei Gakuin University, Kansai University, Doshisha University, and Ritsumeikan University) is the abbreviation that refers to the four leading private universities in the region of 20 million people. Ritsumeikan University is renowned for its International Relations (IR) and Science & Engineering departments, with the Graduate School of International Relations being the only Japanese member of the Association of Professional Schools of International Affairs. Ritsumeikan University has exchange programmes with schools throughout the world, including The University of British Columbia, The University of Melbourne, The University of Sydney, University of Hong Kong, King's College London and The University of Manchester. Ritsumeikan also currently offers a dual bachelor's degree program and dual master's degree programme in collaboration with American University and Australian National University.

Ritsumeikan University Panthers is a top-ranked American-style collegiate football team in Japan and has won three national championships, seven collegiate championships, and nine conference championships.

History 

Ritsumeikan was first founded as a private academy in 1869 by Prince Saionji Kinmochi. In 1900, Kojuro Nakagawa (the former secretary of Prince Saionji) established the Kyoto Hosei School, a law school that eventually adopted the Ritsumeikan name (with the prince's permission) and was awarded full university status in 1922. Historically, the school was seen as a liberal alternative to the state-run Kyoto University.

The name "Ritsumeikan" comes from a Mencius quotation:

Some die young, as some live long lives. This is decided by fate. Therefore, one's duty consists of cultivating one's mind during this mortal span and thereby "establishing one's destiny". (in Japanese, 立命, ritsumei)

The "kan" in addition to "ritsumei" signifies a building.

Colleges and graduate schools (by campus)

Kinugasa Campus 

In Kita-ku, Kyoto, this liberal arts-oriented campus is a roughly five-minute walk from Ryōan-ji and Kinkaku-ji temples. The campus has eight graduate schools, 17,000 undergraduate and 1,100 graduate students.
 Colleges (学部)
 College of Law (法学部)
 College of Social Sciences (産業社会学部)
 College of International Relations (国際関係学部)
 College of Policy Science (政策科学部)
 College of Letters (文学部)
 College of Image Arts and Sciences (映像学部)
 Graduate Schools (大学院)
 Graduate school of Law (法学研究科)
 Graduate school of Sociology (社会学研究科)
 Graduate school of International Relations (国際関係研究科)
 Graduate school of Policy Science (政策科学研究科)
 Graduate school of Letters (文学研究科)
 Graduate school of Science for Human Services (応用人間科学研究科)
 Graduate school of Language Education and Information Science (言語教育情報研究科)
 Graduate school of CoreEthics and Frontier Sciences (先端総合学術研究科)
 Institute at Kinugasa Campus (インスティテュート)
 Inter-faculty Institute for International Studies (国際インスティテュート)
 International Law & Business Program (国際法務プログラム)
 International Civil Service Program (国際公共プログラム)
 International Community Program(国際社会プログラム)
 International Welfare Program (国際福祉プログラム)

Suzaku Campus 
In Nakagyō-ku, Kyoto. This campus houses the School of Law, Graduate School of Management, and Graduate School of Public Policy, in addition to the Ritsumeikan Academy headquarters.
 Graduate Schools (大学院)
 Graduate School of Management (経営管理研究科)
 Graduate School of Public Policy (公務研究科)
 Schools (専門職大学院)
 School of Law (法務研究科)

Biwako-Kusatsu Campus (BKC) 
Biwako-Kusatsu Campus is in Kusatsu, Shiga. This technology-oriented campus is southeast of Lake Biwa, the largest freshwater lake in Japan, and is a 30-minute train ride from Kyōto Station. The campus has four undergraduate colleges, four graduate schools, 16,000 undergraduates and 1,600 graduate students.
 Colleges (学部)
 College of Economics (経済学部) The College of Economics offers three programs pertaining to Economic Strategy, Economic Cooperation and International Economics, and Human Welfare and Economic Conditions. The curriculum integrates theory, history, and knowledge of the current state of affairs in a structured approach on a domestic and foreign scale.
 College of Business Administration (経営学部)
 College of Science and Engineering (理工学部)
 College of Information Science & Engineering (情報理工学部)
 Integrated Institute of Arts & Science (文理総合インスティテュート)
 College of Life Sciences (生命科学部)
 College of Pharmaceutical Sciences (薬学部)
 Graduate schools (大学院)
 Graduate School of Economics (経済学研究科)
 Graduate School of Business Administration (経営学研究科)
 Graduate School of Science and Engineering (理工学研究科)
 Graduate School of Technology Management (テクノロジー・マネジメント研究科)
 Institute at BKC (インスティテュート)
 Integrated Institute for Arts and Science
 Environment & Design Institute (環境・デザインインスティテュート)
 Finance Institute (ファイナンス・情報インスティテュート)
 Service Management Institute (サービス・マネジメントインスティテュート)

Ritsumeikan Asia Pacific University 
The Ritsumeikan Asia Pacific University (立命館 アジア 太平洋 大学, Ritsumeikan Ajia Taiheiyō Daigaku) is a private institution inaugurated April 2000 in Beppu, Ōita Prefecture, Japan. Ritsumeikan Asia Pacific University was made possible through the collaboration of three parties from the public and private sectors: Oita Prefecture, Beppu City and the Ritsumeikan University. APU has an enrollment of just under 6,000 students. Approximately half of the students and faculty members come from overseas, and it has 3 colleges:
 College of Asia Pacific Studies.
 College of International Management.
 College of Sustainability and Tourism (from Academic Year 2023).

Athletics

American Football 

The university has supported an American football rules team since 1953. The team has won three national championships, seven collegiate championships, and nine conference championships.

Facilities

Research Center for Disaster Mitigation Systems 

Established in April 2005 on the Biwako-Kusatsu Campus, work at this center focuses on disaster mitigation using sensor systems and computer networks.

Art Research Center 

Located at Kinugasa Campus, this center houses the Digital Humanities Center for Japanese Arts and Cultures, which focuses on research on Japanese art and culture using digital archives, databases and geographical information systems.

Museums 

The Kyoto Museum for World Peace seeks to critically examine Japan's militaristic past, and includes numerous exhibits ranging from the Sino-Japanese War of 1894–1895 to the Iraq War.

SR center 

Located at BKC campus, this center is established for research using Synchrotron Radiation.

Notable people associated with Ritsumeikan 

Notable people affiliated with Ritsumeikan University, including graduates, former students, and professors:
 Momofuku Ando (1934 College of Economics), founder of Nissin Food Products Co., Ltd. who invented the world's first instant noodles and cup noodles.
 Kenichirou Satou CEO of Rohm
 Den Kawakatsu former CEO of Nankai Electric Railway
 Takashi Haga former chairman and executive director of Marudai Food
 Shinichiro Furumoto (1987 College of Law), a member of the House of Representatives
 Kenta Izumi (1998 College of Law), a member of the House of Representatives
 Tadayoshi Ichida (1967 College of Law), a member of the House of Councillors
 Hiroshi Okada (1969 College of Social Sciences), a member of the House of Councillors
 Atsuya Furuta (1988 College of Business Administration), Nippon Professional Baseball player (Tokyo Yakult Swallows)
 Cico (College of International Relations), singer and half of Bennie K
 Shigetoshi Hasegawa (1990 College of Social Sciences), MLB player
 Masafumi Kawaguchi (1996 College of International Relations), American football player
 Noriaki Kinoshita (College of Business Administration), American football player
 Rikiya Koyama (College of Law), actor
 Daisuke Matsui (College of Business Administration), soccer player
 Tsutomu Minakami, novelist, Naoki Prize winner
 Masayuki Nagare, artist
 Hiroyuki Nagato, actor
 Gorō Naya, actor
 Rokuro Naya (College of Law), actor
 Isin Nisio, novelist
 Tomokazu Ohka (College of Business Administration), MLB player
 Quruli, Japanese music group
 Masumi Yagi and Shigeo Takahashi, comedic duo
 Mai Kuraki (College of Social Sciences, 2005), singer
 Hiroshi Tanahashi, professional wrestler
 Tomoaki Taniguchi, Japan rugby player
 Yuji Ijiri, accounting professor
 Princess Raiyah of Jordan
 Tomotaka Takahashi, robot creator
 Akira Machida, archaeologist
 Yamaguchi Gogen (College of Law), karate master
 Suh Sung, professor and writer
 Otoboke Beaver, punk band

Unions 
Some staff at Ritsumeikan University are represented by the General Union, a member of the National Union of General Workers (NUGW), which is itself a member of the National Trade Union Council (Zenrokyo).

See also 
 Minoru Kitamura
 Ritsumeikan Uji Junior and Senior High School

References

External links 

 Ritsumeikan University (English)
 Ritsumeikan Asian Pacific University
 Profiles of Faculties
 Art Research Center, Ritsumeikan University at Google Cultural Institute

 
American football in Japan
Kansai Big Six
Kansai Collegiate American Football League
Kansai Six (original)
Private universities and colleges in Japan
Universities and colleges in Kyoto
Universities and colleges in Shiga Prefecture
1900 establishments in Japan
Educational institutions established in 1900